Lola Voronina (born 26 November 1983) is a Russian politician of the Pirate Party of Russia (PPRU), and has been beside the Russian born German Grégory Engels of the Pirate Party Germany co-chairperson of Pirate Parties International (PPI) since 15 April 2012.

Voronina was born in Leningrad, in the former Soviet Union. She was also secretary-general of the PPI, the umbrella organization of the international Pirate Party movement, from 13 March 2011 to 15 April 2012. She lives in Prague, Czech Republic.

References 

Russian politicians
Russian women in politics
Politicians from Saint Petersburg
1983 births
Living people